The Chevrolet Silverado 250 was a NASCAR Camping World Truck Series race held at Canadian Tire Motorsport Park (Mosport). It was first held in 2013, and served as the second round of the Truck Series playoffs from their introduction in 2016.

History
The first race held on a road course by the Camping World Truck Series in 13 years, it was announced that the race would be held starting in 2013, on Labor Day weekend, in November 2012, replacing the previous NASCAR Nationwide Series race at Circuit Gilles Villeneuve as NASCAR's annual event held in Canada. In April 2013, it was announced that the race would be sponsored by General Motors Canada, becoming the Chevrolet Silverado 250.

Dillon promised that "next week he won't finish the race" but he didn't pursue any payback eventually. In 2014, Ryan Blaney battled Germán Quiroga and won in a photo finish. In 2016, John Hunter Nemechek and Cole Custer were battling for the lead when Nemechek bumped Custer before running both Custer and himself off-road, pinning Custer to the wall. Before the winner was declared, Nemechek was tackled by Custer; Nemechek would be named the winner.

Starting in 2018, the race became a playoff race and was held as the opener of the playoffs, and the event had yet another last-lap showdown as Noah Gragson and teammate Todd Gilliland wrecked in White's Corner, which let Justin Haley past to take the win. In 2019, it became the second race of the first round of the playoffs.

The 2020 and 2021 races were canceled due to the COVID-19 pandemic and replaced by dates at Darlington Raceway.

Past winners

2016 & 2018: Race extended due to a NASCAR overtime Finish
2020 & 2021: Race canceled and moved to Darlington due to the COVID-19 pandemic.

Team wins

Manufacturer wins

See also
2013 Chevrolet Silverado 250
Mobil 1 SportsCar Grand Prix
Clarington 200

References

External links

NASCAR.com track page

NASCAR Truck Series races
NASCAR races at Canadian Tire Motorsport Park
Sport in Ontario
Clarington
Tourist attractions in the Regional Municipality of Durham
Recurring sporting events established in 2013
2013 establishments in Ontario
Annual sporting events in Canada